The Escuela Técnica Otto Krause is an educational institution located at the intersection of Paseo Colón Avenue and Chile Street, in the San Telmo section of Buenos Aires, Argentina. Named after its founder, the engineer Otto Krause, son of German immigrants, the school was founded in 1897 and is the oldest technological school in the country.

The school currently has around 2000 students and operates a six-year programme.  The first three years (ciclo básico) provide a technical high-school programme for students who have completed their elementary education. Years four to six (ciclo superior) provide the equivalent of a technical college education in various branches of engineering technology.  On completion of their studies here students may go on to university to follow a six-year programme leading to a degree in engineering.

The present school building, which was inaugurated on May 24, 1909, was declared a National Monument in 1995.

Notable alumni
 Gregorio Baro, scientist
 Alejandro Bustillo, architect
 Francisco Salamone, architect
 Oscar Panno, chessmaster
 Ladislao Pazmany, aviation designer

External links
Catalogue of Monuments	
Otto Krause School
Otto Krause

Education in Buenos Aires
Schools in Argentina
Buildings and structures in Buenos Aires
National Historic Monuments of Argentina
Educational institutions established in 1897
1897 establishments in Argentina